Moisés Wolschik (born 24 September 1994), known simply as Moisés or Moisés Gaúcho is a Brazilian footballer who plays as a defensive midfielder for Paraná Clube.

Career

Lajeadense
Moisés Gaúcho began his career at Clube Esportivo Lajeadense in Rio Grande do Sul. On 9 February 2013, he had his first senior call up, remaining an unused substitute in a 1–1 draw at Sport Club ULBRA in the year's Campeonato Gaúcho. Eight days later he made his debut, playing the full 90 minutes of a 3–0 home win over Futebol Clube Santa Cruz as Lajeadense won their group; he totalled four appearances over the season as they finished as runners-up. In the ensuing national season, he totalled seven Campeonato Brasileiro Série D appearances, starting with a 4–4 draw against J. Malucelli Futebol on 1 June.

Grêmio
On 19 September 2013, Moisés Gaúcho signed for powerhouse Grêmio Foot-Ball Porto Alegrense. He made his debut for them on the following 19 January, playing the full 90 minutes of a 1–0 loss at Esporte Clube São José in the first game of the edition of the state championship; Moisés Gaucho made two other starts that month, his only appearances of a campaign in which his team were runners-up to arch-rivals Sport Club Internacional.

Moisés Gaúcho did not play again until the 2015 Campeonato Brasileiro Série A, coming on in added time in place of Douglas in a 3–1 win over Santos FC at the Estádio Urbano Caldeira; he totalled eight appearances, three of which starts.

Honours
Grêmio
Copa do Brasil: 2016

Chapecoense
Campeonato Catarinense: 2017

References

External links

1994 births
Living people
Brazilian footballers
Association football midfielders
Campeonato Brasileiro Série A players
Campeonato Brasileiro Série D players
Clube Esportivo Lajeadense players
Grêmio Foot-Ball Porto Alegrense players
Associação Chapecoense de Futebol players
Londrina Esporte Clube players
Esporte Clube Juventude players
Paraná Clube players
Campeonato Brasileiro Série C players